Kangaamiut, formerly known as Gammel Sukkertoppen, is a settlement with a population of 293 (2020) in the Qeqqata municipality in central-western Greenland.

Geography 
Kangaamiut is located on an island off the coast of Davis Strait between mouths of two long fjords. To the south is the long and twisted Kangerlussuatsiaq Fjord and to the north is the Kangaamiut Kangerluarsuat Fjord.

History 
The Dano-Norwegian settlement Sukkertoppen was originally located at the site of present-day Kangaamiut, when it was founded in 1755. It was moved to its present location at Maniitsoq in 1782.

Transport 
Kangaamiut serves as a port of call for the Arctic Umiaq Line coastal ship.

Population 
Kangaamiut has experienced a sharp decline in its population. The settlement has lost more than 36% of its population relative to 1990 and more than 26% relative to 2000.

References

Davis Strait
Populated places in Greenland
Qeqqata